Frederick Goliah (1888 - November 21, 1935) was a  Negro leagues infielder  for several years before the founding of the first Negro National League, and in its first few seasons. He played for the Chicago Giants, Chicago American Giants and Leland Giants. He also played for the 25th Infantry Wreckers team during World War I.

References

External links
 and Baseball-Reference Black Baseball stats and Seamheads

1888 births
1935 deaths
Chicago American Giants players
Chicago Giants players
Illinois Giants players
Leland Giants players
20th-century African-American people
United States Army soldiers